Richard Armstrong Dale (21 May 1896 – 1975) was an English professional footballer who played as a wing half. He played 146 games in the First Division of the Football League for Birmingham before moving on to West Bromwich Albion and Tranmere Rovers. He finished his career back in his native north-east of England, in non-League football with Crook Town.

Life and career
Dale was born in Willington, County Durham, in 1896, the son of James Dale, an engine man in a coal mine, and his wife Elizabeth. The 1911 Census finds him living with his parents and two younger sisters in North Walbottle, Northumberland, and working as a pony driver in a coal mine.

Dale played for Stanley United, North Walbottle and West Hartlepool before joining Football League First Division club Birmingham on trial in March 1922. The trial proved successful, he made his Football League debut on 6 September 1922 in a goalless draw away to Newcastle United, and, according to the Athletic News in March 1924, he "gave such a sound and, indeed, striking display, even at left half-back, that he has been considered a regular member of the side ever since." He kept his place for two more matches before the England international Percy Barton returned from injury. A few weeks later, after more injuries left a vacancy at right half, Dale "demonstrated his versatility by at once falling into the position", and held it until mid-March 1923 when Jimmy Daws came back into the team. He made 34 League appearances in the 1923–24 season, mainly at right half but also covering at centre half.

Over the next three seasons, he played in 75 League matches, not always first choice in the starting eleven but always first choice as cover for any half-back position. Often noted for his enthusiasm and work-rate, and sometimes for his judgment, he was at his peak from 1925 to 1926, having dislodged Barton to the covering role in the latter part of the 1925–26 season and retained the left-half position for much of the following campaign. In September 1927, he stood in successfully for Jimmy Cringan at centre half, but played little during the rest of the season. Early in the 1928–29 season, Dale stood in for the injured Barton for seven games, and was reported to have "[given] a good account of himself" in a goalless draw away against Arsenal, but he was soon to move on. He had played 151 matches in League and FA Cup but, despite the Sports Argus correspondent's view some four years earlier that he was "fast developing into a good shot", never scored.

Second Division club West Bromwich Albion, who were in dire need of a half-back,they had three left halves on the books, all of whom were unfitpaid "just over two thousand pounds" for Dale's services, and put him straight into their League eleven. An injury in mid-January kept him out for two months, and he made only ten League appearances, followed with nine in 1929–30. He married Alice Sadler in Newcastle during the 1930 close season.

After a season unable to break back into the first team as Albion gained promotion to the First Division and beat Birmingham in the 1931 FA Cup Final, Dale joined Tranmere Rovers of the Third Division North for a club record fee paid of £400. He made ten appearances in all senior competitions, and returned to his native north east of England. In November 1932, he joined North-Eastern League club Crook Town as player-coach.

The 1939 Register finds him living in Newburn, Northumberland, and working as a colliery labourer. In the early 1950s, he was scouting for West Bromwich Albion. Dale died in Newcastle in 1975 at the age of 79.

Career statistics

References
General
 
 

Specific

1896 births
1975 deaths
People from Willington, County Durham
Footballers from County Durham
English footballers
Association football wing halves
Stanley United F.C. players
Birmingham City F.C. players
West Bromwich Albion F.C. players
Tranmere Rovers F.C. players
Crook Town A.F.C. players
English Football League players
West Bromwich Albion F.C. non-playing staff
Date of death missing